A Commissioners' church is an Anglican church in the United Kingdom built with money voted by Parliament as a result of the Church Building Act 1818, and subsequent related Acts.  Such churches have been given a number of titles, including "Commissioners' Churches", "Waterloo Churches" and "Million Act Churches".  In some cases the Commissioners provided the full cost of the new church; in other cases they provided a grant and the balance was raised locally.  This list contains the Commissioners' churches in Wales.

Key

Churches

See also
List of Commissioners' churches in eastern England
List of Commissioners' churches in the English Midlands
List of Commissioners' churches in London
List of Commissioners' churches in Northeast and Northwest England
List of Commissioners' churches in southwest England
List of Commissioners' churches in Yorkshire

References
Citations

Sources

 Wales
 Commissioners' churches
 
Commissioners' churches in Wales